Tomas Intas (born 15 September 1981, in Klaipėda) is a Lithuanian javelin thrower. His personal best throw is 82.94 metres, achieved in September 2004 in Banská Bystrica.

Achievements

Seasonal bests by year
1999 - 77.88
2001 - 78.12
2002 - 78.63
2004 - 82.94
2005 - 82.04
2006 - 77.15
2007 - 77.68
2009 - 78.08

External links

1981 births
Living people
Lithuanian male javelin throwers
Sportspeople from Klaipėda